Currently, there are 9 administrative divisions of Minsk, called raions (districts):

History
The first subdivision of Minsk was carried out in August 1921: the Central Committee of the Communist Party of Belarus divided Minsk into three party administration districts: Aleksandrovsky (Александровский), Lyakhovsky (Ляховский), and Central (Центральный).

By the decree of the Central Executive Committee of Byelorussian SSR of March 17, 1938, Minsk was divided into three raions for general administration:
Stalinski, i.e., Stalin district, renamed into Zavodzki (Factory/Plant district, after major tractor and automobile plants located there) in 1961 
Varashylauski, i.e., Voroshilov district, renamed into Savetski (Soviet district) in 1961
Kahanovichski, i.e., Kaganovich district.

On July 20, 1957, the Kaganovich district was renamed into Oktyabrski (October district).
On November 2, 1961, the Stalin district was renamed to the Factory district and the Voroshilov district into the Soviet district.

Coats of arms of the districts
Except for Maskowski, each district has got its coat of arms. 7 of them have their name written in Russian, Savyetski in Belarusian.

Microraions 
There are also microraions, areas of housing development outside the historical centre, primarily residential areas. Many of them are named after the suburban villages swallowed by the city. Others are named after the major streets.

 Aeradromnaya
 Akademharadok
 Anharskaya
 Azyaryshcha
 Chyrvony Bor
 Chyzhouka
 Drazdy
 Drazhnya
 Kharkauskaya
 Kuntsaushchyna
 Kurasoushchyna
 Loshytsa
 Malinauka
 Maly Trastsyanets
 Masyukoushchyna
 Paudnyovy Zahad
 Paunochny Pasyolak
 Sierabranka
 Shabany
 Sokal
 Sosny
 Stsypyanka
 Sukharava
 Syarova
 Uruchcha
 Uskhod
 Uskhodni
 Vyalikaya Slyapyanka
 Vyasnyanka
 Zahad
 Zyalyony Luh

See also
Arrondissement: equivalent type of municipal division in French-speaking countries and territories

References

External links
 Districts of Minsk on www.minsk.gov.by